Denis Gurdzhi (born 25 January 2003) is a German figure skater. He is the 2021 German national champion and competed in the final segment at the 2020 World Junior Championships.

Personal life 
Gurdzhi was born on 25 January 2003 in Cologne. He has an older sister by eight years, Juliana, who represented Germany internationally in pairs. Gurdzhi's parents are from Russia. In 2019, he lost one finger during an accident in which he fell on the street.

Programs

Competitive highlights 
JGP: Junior Grand Prix

Detailed results 
ISU Personal best in bold.

Senior-level results

Junior-level results

References

External links 
 
 

2003 births
Living people
German male single skaters
German people of Russian descent
Sportspeople from Cologne